Denis McQuade (born 6 January 1951, in Glasgow) is a Scottish former footballer, who played for Partick Thistle, Hearts and Hamilton. McQuade scored one of the goals for Partick Thistle in their shock 4–1 victory against Celtic in the 1971 Scottish League Cup Final.

References

1951 births
Living people
Footballers from Glasgow
Association football wingers
Scottish footballers
Partick Thistle F.C. players
Heart of Midlothian F.C. players
Hamilton Academical F.C. players
Scottish Football League players
Scottish Football League representative players
Scotland under-23 international footballers
St Roch's F.C. players
Scottish Junior Football Association players